Lod Air Force Base, also Air Force Base 27, was an Israeli Air Force airfield that was part of the Ben Gurion International Airport, located approximately  north of Lod;  east-southeast of Tel Aviv.

From 1938 to 1948 it was known as RAF Station Lydda while under British Royal Air Force control.

History
The Lydda Airport, built in 1934, was used by the Allies during the Second World War becoming RAF Lydda on 1 March 1943.  After the Israeli declaration of independence, it became an IAF airfield and the only international airport in the new state of Israel.  The airfield military base officially closed down on 2 August 2008, after its last units moved to Nevatim. On the same airfield the Ben Gurion International Airport is still operating as the main airport of Israel.

RAF Operational units
No. 14 Squadron RAF (1941) Bristol Blenheim IV
No. 33 Squadron RAF detachment (1938) Gloster Gladiator
No. 55 Squadron RAF detachment (1942) Martin Baltimore
No. 134 Squadron RAF (1942) Supermarine Spitfire VB
No. 162 Squadron RAF detachment (1942) Bristol Blenheim V
No. 203 Squadron RAF detachment (1941) Bristol Blenheim IV
No. 211 Squadron RAF (1941) Bristol Blenheim I
No. 294 Squadron RAF detachment (1944) Vickers Wellington
No. 459 Squadron RAAF (1942–1943) Lockheed Hudson III
No. 1413 (Meteorological) Flight RAF (1942–1943 and 1945)

Between July and November, 1942, the US Army, Middle East Air Force - USAMEAF operated B-17 Flying Fortress and B-24 Liberator aircraft from RAF Lydda.  These aircraft were reassigned to Egypt in November.

See also

 List of former Royal Air Force stations
 List of World War II North Africa Airfields

References

Citations

Bibliography

 Jefford, C.G. RAF Squadrons, a Comprehensive Record of the Movement and Equipment of all RAF Squadrons and their Antecedents since 1912. Shrewsbury, Shropshire, UK: Airlife Publishing, 2001. .
 Sturtivant, Ray, ISO and John Hamlin. RAF Flying Training And Support Units since 1912. Tonbridge, Kent, UK: Air-Britain (Historians) Ltd., 2007. .

Airfields of the United States Army Air Forces Air Transport Command in the Middle East
Airfields of the United States Army Air Forces
Lod
Israeli Air Force bases
World War II airfields in Mandatory Palestine